The 2002 Michigan gubernatorial election was one of the 36 United States gubernatorial elections held on November 5, 2002. Incumbent Republican Governor John Engler, after serving three terms, was term-limited and was ineligible to run for a fourth term; his lieutenant governor Dick Posthumus, also a Republican, ran in his place. Jennifer Granholm, then Attorney General of Michigan, ran on the Democratic Party ticket. Douglas Campbell ran on the Green Party ticket, and Joseph M. Pilchak ran on the Constitution Party ticket.

Granholm won with 51% of the vote, followed by Posthumus' 47%, Campbell with 1%, and Pilchak with less than 1%.  This made Granholm the first female Michigan governor and the first Democratic governor of Michigan in 12 years.

Republican primary
With incumbent Governor John Engler ineligible to seek re-election for a fourth term, Posthumus, Michigan's lieutenant governor, was considered the overwhelming favorite for the Republican nomination. Following his primary win, Posthumus selected state Sen. Loren Bennett as his running mate.

Results

Jim Moody created a candidate committee and filed a Statement of Organization, but did not submit sufficient ballot-access petition signatures to be included on the 2002 primary ballot.

Democratic primary

Candidates
Jennifer Granholm – Michigan Attorney General, 1999–2003; former Corporation Counsel for Wayne County, 1994–1998

Eliminated in primary
David Bonior – former U.S. Representative for MI-12, 1977–1993, and MI-10, 1993–2003; former House Majority Whip, 1991–1995, and former House Minority Whip, 1995–2002.
James Blanchard – former Governor of Michigan, 1983–1991; former U.S. Representative for MI-18, 1975–1983; and former United States Ambassador to Canada, 1993–1996.

The Democratic Party was a competitive, three-way race with between state Attorney General Jennifer Granholm, former Gov. James Blanchard (who was upset by Engler in 1990) and former House Minority Whip David Bonior.

Granholm was accused in the 2002 Democratic primary of several allegations of cronyism while working as Wayne County Corporation Counsel.  Her husband, Daniel Mulhern, had received several contracts for his leadership training company shortly after Granholm left her position as a Wayne County Corporation Counsel in 1998. He received nearly $300,000 worth of contracts, despite being the highest bidder for one of those contracts. Opponents criticized Granholm supporters for engaging in cronyism and giving contracts to her husband immediately after leaving county employment. Granholm and her supporters responded that no ethical violations occurred and that Mulhern had earned the contracts on his own merits.

Granholm was the first woman ever nominated by a major party to be Michigan governor. Following her primary victory, Granholm chose state Sen. John Cherry as her running mate.

Results

Minor parties

Candidates

Green Party
The Green Party of Michigan nominated Douglas Campbell. Campbell, a registered professional engineer and published Atheist from Ferndale, joined the Green party upon learning of its existence in 2000, and was the Wayne-Oakland-Macomb county campaign coordinator for Green Party presidential candidate Ralph Nader, 2000. During the 2002 campaign he claimed he was beaten, arrested and jailed (in Brighton, Michigan) for attempting to participate in a gubernatorial debate from which he was excluded, at the time being the only candidate who was not either a Republican or Democrat.

United States Taxpayers Party (Constitution Party)
Capac resident Joseph Pilchak was nominated by convention to be the U.S. Taxpayers Party candidate for Governor of Michigan. He was the U.S. Taxpayers Party candidate for U.S. Representative from Michigan 10th District in 2000. The Michigan US Taxpayers' Party is affiliated with the United States Constitution Party, but Michigan election law does not provide a mechanism for changing the name of a political party.

General election
Posthumus, who had been previous Governor Engler's Lieutenant Governor, ran his general election campaign promising to maintain the Engler legacy.

Granholm promised change, running as a tough crime fighter and consumer advocate. Granholm criticized the Engler administration for coming into office with a budget surplus and leaving with a deficit.

Kilpatrick memo controversy
In the biggest event of the election, Posthumus released a memo from Detroit Mayor Kwame Kilpatrick asking for more appointments for blacks and jobs for Detroit contractors in a Granholm administration. Posthumus pointed to the memo as an example of Democratic Party corruption. Granholm, however, denied ever receiving the memo and said she wouldn't have agreed to it anyway. She said Posthumus was trying to be racially divisive.

Predictions

Polling

Results by county

Notes

References

External links
 2002 Official Michigan General Candidate Listing
 2002 Official Michigan Primary Election Results
 2002 Official Michigan General Election Results

Michigan
2002
Gubernatorial